The following is a list of notable deaths in December 2011.

Entries for each day are listed alphabetically by surname. A typical entry lists information in the following sequence:
 Name, age, country of citizenship at birth, subsequent country of citizenship (if applicable), reason for notability, cause of death (if known), and reference.

December 2011

1
Solomon Abera, 43, Eritrean journalist.
Shingo Araki, 72, Japanese animation artist and character designer (Yu-Gi-Oh!, Galaxy Express 999).
Eric Arnott, 82, British eye surgeon.
Arthur Beetson, 66, Australian rugby league footballer, first Indigenous Australian to captain a national team in any sport, heart attack.
Andrei Blaier, 78, Romanian film director and screenwriter, after long illness.
Martina Davis-Correia, 44, American civil rights activist, breast cancer.
Ragnhild Hveger, 90, Danish swimmer, Olympic silver medalist (1936). 
Ted Lapka, 91, American football player (Washington Redskins).
François Lesage, 82, French embroidery designer.
Bill McKinney, 80, American actor (Deliverance, The Outlaw Josey Wales, First Blood), esophageal cancer.
Mr. Ebbo, 37, Tanzanian rapper, leukemia.
Purificacion Quisumbing, 77, Filipino human rights advocate, Chairperson of Commission on Human Rights (2002–2008), multiple myeloma.
Louis Silverstein, 92, American artist and graphic designer.
Alan Sues, 85, American comic (Rowan & Martin's Laugh-In), heart attack.
Hippolyte Van den Bosch, 85, Belgian football player.
Christa Wolf, 82, German writer.
Elisabeth Young-Bruehl, 65, American psychoanalyst, biographer of Hannah Arendt, pulmonary embolism.

2
Robert Lawrence Balzer, 99, American wine journalist.
Bruno Bianchi, 56, French cartoonist and animator (Heathcliff and The Catillac Cats), co-creator of Inspector Gadget.
Laurent Fuahea, 84, Tongan-born Wallisian Roman Catholic prelate, Bishop of Wallis et Futuna (1974–2005).
Chiyono Hasegawa, 115, Japanese supercentenarian, nation's oldest person and world's second oldest living person.
Pavle Jurina, 57, Croatian handball player and coach.
Christopher Logue, 85, British poet.
David Montgomery, 84, American historian, brain hemorrhage.
Artur Quaresma, 94, Portuguese footballer.
Patrick Sheridan, 89, American Roman Catholic prelate, Auxiliary Bishop of New York (1990–2001).
Bill Tapia, 103, American ukulelist.
Howard Tate, 72, American soul singer.

3
Jalal Alamgir, 40, Bangladeshi academic, drowning.
Dev Anand, 88, Indian actor, cardiac arrest.
James A. Barclay, 88, Scottish Canadian engineer and executive, golfer, and golf historian, natural causes.
Louky Bersianik, 81, Canadian novelist.
Philip "Fatis" Burrell, 57, Jamaican record producer, stroke.
Ernst-Jürgen Dreyer, 77, German writer.
Sabri Godo, 82, Albanian politician, writer and scriptwriter, founder and president of the Republican Party of Albania, lung cancer.
Karl-Axel Karlsson, 72, Swedish Olympic sport shooter (1972, 1976).
Sam Loxton, 90, Australian cricketer (The Invincibles), Australian rules footballer and politician, Victorian MLA for Prahran (1955–1979).
Larry Rickles, 41, American Emmy Award-winning producer (Mr. Warmth: The Don Rickles Project), pneumonia.
Rafael Rodríguez Barrera, 74, Mexican politician, Governor of Campeche (1973–1979), President of the Institutional Revolutionary Party (1992–1993).
Rob Schroeder, 85, American racing driver.
Heinrich Sonne, 94, German Waffen-SS member, recipient of the Knight's Cross of the Iron Cross.

4
Mary Ellen Avery, 84, American pediatrician.
Antonio Barone, 72, Italian physicist.
Allan Cameron, 94, Scottish soldier and curler.
Ambika Charan Choudhury, 81, Indian writer.
Marion Dougherty, 88, American casting director (Full Metal Jacket, Batman, Midnight Cowboy).
Patricia C. Dunn, 58, American businesswoman, Chairman of Hewlett-Packard (2005–2006), ovarian cancer.
Adam Hanuszkiewicz, 87, Polish actor and theatre director.
Matti Yrjänä Joensuu, 63, Finnish crime fiction writer.
Besim Kabashi, 35, Albanian kickboxer, heart attack.
Dimitris Kaligeris, 62, Greek footballer (Panathinaikos F.C., Kalamata F.C.), traffic collision.
Alamein Kopu, 68, New Zealand politician, List MP (1996–1999).
Jim Malosky, 82, American football coach (Minnesota-Duluth Bulldogs), respiratory failure.
Solange Pierre, 48, Dominican Republic human rights advocate, winner of Robert F. Kennedy Human Rights Award (2006), heart attack.
RJ Rosales, 37, Filipino-born Australian singer and actor.
Sócrates, 57, Brazilian footballer, septic shock.
Hubert Sumlin, 80, American blues guitarist, heart failure.
Andrei Tverdokhlebov, 70, Soviet dissident.

5
Dan Biggers, 80, American actor (In the Heat of the Night, Glory, Elizabethtown).
Michel Descombey, 81, French choreographer.
Paul M. Doty, 91, American scientist.
Tetsuzo Fuyushiba, 75, Japanese politician, Minister of Land, Infrastructure, Transport and Tourism (2006–2008), acute pneumonia.
Peter Gethin, 71, British Formula One driver (1970–1974).
Jorge Hourton, 85, French-born Chilean Roman Catholic prelate, Auxiliary Bishop of Temuco (1992–2001).
Anatoly Klebanov, 59, Soviet Olympic water polo player.
Gennady Logofet, 69, Russian footballer.
Joe Lonnett, 84, American baseball player and coach.
Dan Mills, 80, American animator (Family Guy, He-Man and the Masters of the Universe).
Daisy Myers, 86, African-American educator.
Pusuke, 26, Japanese dog, world's oldest known living dog at time of death.
Bill Stits, 80, American football player (Detroit Lions, San Francisco 49ers, New York Giants), complications from Alzheimer's disease.
Darrell K. Sweet, 77, American artist.
Georges Talbourdet, 60, French cyclist.
Violetta Villas, 73, Belgian-born Polish singer.
Celia, Viscountess Whitelaw of Penrith, 84, British ATS volunteer, philanthropist/charity worker and horticulturist.

6
Günter Altner, 75, German interdisciplanarily scientist.
Giancarlo Badessi, 83, Italian actor, heart attack.
John Banks, 89, American Negro league baseball player.
Brent Darby, 30, American basketball player (Ohio State University), blood clots.
Tony Fell, 79, British music publisher.
Ron Fletcher, 90, American dancer and pilates teacher, heart failure.
Dobie Gray, 71, American singer, cancer. ("The 'In' Crowd", "Drift Away").
Barbara Orbison, 61, German-born American record producer and music publisher, widow of Roy Orbison, pancreatic cancer.
Paul Ramírez, 25, Venezuelan footballer, stroke.
Lawrie Tierney, 52, Scottish footballer.

7
Pearse Cahill, 95, Irish aviation pioneer.
Peter Croker, 89, English footballer (Charlton Athletic).
Teresa Hsu, 113, Chinese-born Singaporean social worker and supercentenarian.
Tom Kennedy, 63, American film trailer producer.
*Nuno Viriato Tavares de Melo Egídio, 89, Portuguese general, Governor of Macau (1979–1981).
Harry Morgan, 96, American actor (M*A*S*H, Dragnet, December Bride), pneumonia.
Elizabeth Ann Ray, 98, American USAF officer.
Jerry Robinson, 89, American comic book artist (Batman), co-creator of Robin and The Joker.
Charlie Russell, 74, Canadian country music DJ.
T. A. Springer, 85, Dutch mathematician.

8
Gilbert Adair, 66, Scottish author, film critic and journalist, brain haemorrhage.
Mihai Botez, 89, Romanian Olympic gymnast.
Peter Brown, 77, English footballer.
Robert Brown, 61, American politician, Georgia State Senator (1991–2011), suicide by gunshot.
Lewis Bush, 42, American football player (San Diego Chargers, Kansas City Chiefs), apparent heart attack.
Sir Zelman Cowen, 92, Australian constitutional lawyer and academic, 19th Governor-General of Australia (1977–1982).
Vinko Cuzzi, 72, Croatian footballer.
Ladislas de Hoyos, 72, French journalist and news anchor (TF1).
Đơn Dương, 54, Vietnamese-born American actor (We Were Soldiers), heart failure and brain hemorrhage.
Gene Huff, 82, American politician, member of the Kentucky House of Representatives (1967–1971) and State Senator (1971–1994), lung disease.
Peggy Makins, 95, British agony aunt.
Giorgio Mariani, 65, Italian footballer.
Minoru Miki, 81, Japanese composer. 
Andrew Pataki, 84, American Eastern Catholic hierarch, Bishop of Parma for Ruthenian (1984–1995) and Passaic for Ruthenian (1995–2007).
Joe Restic, 85, American NCAA and CFL football coach (Harvard Crimson, Hamilton Tiger-Cats).
Charles Ritcheson, 86, American historian and diplomat.
Nakdimon Rogel, 86, Israeli journalist and broadcaster, author of the Nakdi Report.
Anthony Harbord-Hamond, 11th Baron Suffield, 89, British soldier and aristocrat.

9
Alf R. Bjercke, 90, Norwegian business magnate.
Jacques Debary, 97, French actor.
Pushpa Hans, 94, Indian playback singer and actress.
Davida Karol, 94, Israeli actress.
João Pereira dos Santos, 93, Brazilian martial artist (Capoeira).
Len Phillips, 89, English footballer (Portsmouth, England).
Richard J. Rabbitt, 76, American politician, Speaker of the Missouri House of Representatives (1973–1977), heart failure.
Roy Tattersall, 89, British Test cricketer.
Myra Taylor, 94, American jazz singer.

10
Cary D. Allred, 64, American politician, member of the North Carolina Senate (1980–1984) and North Carolina House of Representatives (1994–2009).
Jean Baucus, 94, American author, historian and arts patron, mother of Max Baucus.
Hamilton Bobby, 44, Indian footballer, heart attack.
Alan D.B. Clarke, 89, British psychologist.
John Gower, 70, American politician, member of the Wisconsin State Assembly (1973–1979).
Vida Jerman, 72, Croatian actress, lung cancer.
Albert Overhauser, 86, American physicist.
Stephen Schlossberg, 90, American union leader.
Ernst Specker, 91, Swiss mathematician (Kochen–Specker theorem).
Frank Stephens, 98, Australian surgeon.

11
 Rodolfo Bottino, 52, Brazilian actor (Bambolê, Bebê a Bordo, O Homem do Futuro) and chef, pulmonary embolism.
 Phillip Cottrell, 43, British born New Zealand journalist (BBC Scotland, Radio New Zealand), assaulted.
 Mimi Darwish, 69, Egyptian Olympic footballer (1964).
 John Patrick Foley, 76, American Roman Catholic Cardinal and Grand Master Emeritus of the Equestrian Order of the Holy Sepulchre of Jerusalem, leukemia.
 Susan Gordon, 62, American child actress (The Five Pennies, My Three Sons, The Twilight Zone), thyroid cancer.
 J. Lynn Helms, 86, American Marine Corps officer, Administrator of the Federal Aviation Administration (1981–1984), cardiopulmonary failure and pneumonia.
Mabel Holle, 91, American baseball player (AAGPBL).
 Hans Heinz Holz, 84, German Marxist philosopher.
 Harold Hopkins, 67, Australian actor (Don's Party, Gallipoli, Underbelly: A Tale of Two Cities), mesothelioma.
Eric Howlett, 84, American inventor.
*Ke Yan, 82, Chinese poet and writer.
Ahmed İhsan Kırımlı, 91, Turkish doctor, politician, poet and philanthropist.
 Leonida Lari, 62, Moldovan-born Romanian writer and politician, member of the Supreme Soviet (1989–1991) and Romanian Parliament (1992–2008), breast cancer.
 Mario Miranda, 85, Indian cartoonist.
 Bonnie Prudden, 97, American rock climber and physical fitness advocate.
M. S. Reddy, 87, Indian film producer, long illness.

12
Sunday Bada, 42, Nigerian Olympic sprinter, gold medalist (2000).
Clyde Conner, 78, American football player (San Francisco 49ers).
John Gardner, 94, British classical music composer.
Heini Lohrer, 93, Swiss Olympic ice hockey player (1948).
Alberto de Mendoza, 88, Argentine actor (Horror Express).
Mălina Olinescu, 37, Romanian singer (Eurovision Song Contest 1998), suicide.
Sir Robert Peliza, 91, Gibraltarian politician, Chief Minister (1969–1972).
Bert Schneider, 78, American film and television producer (Easy Rider, Five Easy Pieces, The Monkees), natural causes.
Merih Sezen, 93, Turkish Olympic fencer (1948).
Randy Stein, 58, American baseball player.
Gene Summers, 83, American architect (McCormick Place), liver disease.

13
David Allen, 74, Northern Irish politician, stroke.
Nordine Amrani, 33, Belgian-Moroccan terrorist, suicide by gunshot.
T. J. Bass, 79, American writer.
Graham Brown, 87, American actor (Malcolm X, The Muppets Take Manhattan), pulmonary failure.
Kabir Chowdhury, 88, Bangladeshi writer.
Russell Hoban, 86, American writer.
Park Tae-joon, 84, South Korean businessman, Prime Minister (2000), breathing difficulties.
Klaus-Dieter Sieloff, 69, German footballer.
Erica Wilson, 83, British-born American embroidery designer.

14
Roy Ash, 93, American businessman and public official, Director of the Office of Management and Budget (1972–1975).
Graham Booth, 71, British politician, Member of the European Parliament for South West England (2002–2008).
Luigi Carpaneda, 86, Italian Olympic fencer, gold medalist (1956).
Boris Chertok, 99, Soviet and Russian rocket designer.
Pedro Febles, 53, Venezuelan footballer and manager. (Spanish)
Karl-Heinrich von Groddeck, 75, German Olympic rower, gold medalist (1960).
Thomas C. Kelly, 80, American Roman Catholic prelate, Archbishop of Louisville (1981–2007).
Arthur King, 84, Canadian boxer.
Carol Murphy, 79, American politician, member of the New Jersey General Assembly (1993–2002).
Mark Francis Schmitt, 88, American Roman Catholic prelate, Bishop of Marquette (1978–1992).
Don Sharp, 90, Australian-born British film director (Hammer horror).
Joe Simon, 98, American comic book writer (Captain America, Fighting American, Prez).
Billie Jo Spears, 74, American country music singer ("Blanket on the Ground"), cancer.
George Whitman, 98, American bookstore proprietor (Shakespeare and Company), complications of a stroke.
James A. Zimble, 78, American Navy officer, Surgeon General of the United States Navy (1987–1991).

15
Eduardo Barreto, 57, Uruguayan comic book artist (Batman, Superman, Martian Manhunter).
Emmett L. Bennett, Jr., 93, American classicist whose cataloging of Linear B led to its decipherment.
Bob Brookmeyer, 81, American jazz valve trombonist, cardiopulmonary arrest.
Adriano Capuzzo, 84, Italian Olympic equestrian Adriano Capuzzo Bio, Stats, and Results | Olympics at Sports-Reference.com
Andy Carey, 80, American baseball player (New York Yankees).
Walter Giller, 84, German actor.
Christopher Hitchens, 62, British writer (God Is Not Great) and commentator (Vanity Fair), esophageal cancer.
Paula Hyman, 65, American professor of modern Jewish history (Yale University).
Ricardo Ibarra, 61, Argentine Olympic rower (1972, 1976, 1984).
Guy Ignolin, 75, French professional cyclist.
Gadzhimurat Kamalov, 46, Russian journalist, shot.
Herbert Kesel, 80, German Olympic rower.
Malik Nur Khan, 88, Pakistani air marshal, Chief of Air Staff (1965–1969) and Governor of West Pakistan (1969–1970).
Frank X. McDermott, 87, American politician, President of the New Jersey Senate (1967–1973).
James M. Quigley, 93, American politician, Representative from Pennsylvania (1955–1957; 1959–1961).
Jason Richards, 35, New Zealand race car driver (V8 Supercars), adrenocortical carcinoma.
Carmen Rupe, 75, New Zealand transsexual entertainer, kidney failure.
Fevzi Şeker, 49, Turkish wrestler, heart attack.
Mario Tovar González, 78, Mexican Olympic wrestler (1952–1968), respiratory complications.

16
Ulf Aas, 92, Norwegian illustrator.
Franghiz Ahmadova, 83, Azerbaijani operatic soprano and music teacher.
Robert Easton, 81, American dialect coach and actor (Working Girl, Pete's Dragon, Star Trek VI: The Undiscovered Country).
Dan Frazer, 90, American actor (Kojak, As the World Turns), cardiac arrest.
Alice Glenn, 89, Irish politician, TD for Dublin Central (1981–1982; 1982–1987).
Chubee Kagita, 54, Japanese politician, heart failure.
Henry Kitchener, 3rd Earl Kitchener, 92, British soldier and aristocrat.
Mark Kopytman, 82, Ukrainian-born Israeli composer.
Bert Muhly, 88, American politician and academic, Mayor of Santa Cruz, California (1974–1975), heart failure.
Patrick V. Murphy, 91, American police chief, New York City Police Commissioner (1970–1973), heart attack.
Michele O'Callaghan, 48, American makeup artist, cancer.
Te Paekiomeka Joy Ruha, 80, New Zealand Māori leader.
Keith W. Wilcox, 90, American architect and politician, member of LDS priesthood.
Nicol Williamson, 75, Scottish actor (Inadmissible Evidence, Spawn, Excalibur), esophageal cancer.

17
Charles Chester, 92, English rugby player.
Michael Gower Coleman, 72, South African Roman Catholic prelate, Bishop of Port Elizabeth (1986–2011).
Eva Ekvall, 28, Venezuelan TV news anchor and model, Miss Venezuela 2000, breast cancer.
Cesária Évora, 70, Cape Verdean singer, heart failure.
Maurice Huggett, 66, English nightclub proprietor.
*Kim Jong-il, 69, North Korean Supreme Leader (since 1994), heart attack.
Harley Sewell, 80, American football player (Detroit Lions, Los Angeles Rams).
Marian Wohlwender, 89, American AAGPBL baseball player.

18
Doe Avedon, 86, American actress (The High and the Mighty) and model, pneumonia.
Cor Bakker, 93, Dutch cyclist.
Jean Boucher, 85, Canadian politician, Member of Parliament for Châteauguay—Huntingdon—Laprairie (1953–1958).
Henry E. Catto, Jr., 81, American public servant and diplomat, complications of leukemia.
Jeremy Doyle, 28, Australian wheelchair basketball player, Paralympic gold medalist (2009), bladder cancer.
Václav Havel, 75, Czech playwright and politician, President of Czechoslovakia (1989–1992) and the Czech Republic (1993–2003).
Warren Hellman, 77, American investor, founder of Hardly Strictly Bluegrass festivals, complications from leukemia treatment.
Evans Knowles, 97, Canadian politician, Member of Parliament for Norfolk (1957–1962).
Ralph MacDonald, 67, American percussionist and songwriter, lung cancer.
Ted Markland, 78, American actor.
Donald Neilson, 75, English serial killer.
John Rex, 86, South African-born British sociologist.
Johnny Silvo, 75, British folk and blues singer.
Brian Sparkes, 70, Canadian biochemist.
Ronald Wolfe, 89, British sitcom writer (The Rag Trade, On the Buses), complications from a fall.
Marijan Žužej, 77, Croatian Olympic silver medal-winning (1956) water polo player.
Lorenzo de Rodas, 81, Spanish-Mexican actor.

19
George Athor, 49, South Sudanese rebel leader, shot.
Gerard Louis Goettel, 83, American senior judge of the District Court for the Southern District of New York.
Luciano Magistrelli, 73, Italian Olympic footballer (1960), heart attack.
Kathleen Malach, 85, American AAGPBL baseball player.
Héctor Núñez, 75, Uruguayan footballer, after long illness.
William G. Robinson, 85, American politician, member of the Massachusetts House of Representatives.
Ron Smith, 70, American radio host (WBAL), pancreatic cancer.

20
Robert Ader, 79, American psychologist, co-founder of psychoneuroimmunology.
Hana Andronikova, 44, Czech writer and playwright, cancer.
Sean Bonniwell, 71, American guitarist, singer and songwriter (The Music Machine), lung cancer.
Howard P. Boyd, 97, American naturalist.
Hugh Carless, 86, British diplomat and explorer.
Jack Goldman, 90, American physicist, chief scientist at Xerox Corporation.
Khalifa Kambi, 56, Gambian politician, Deputy Minister of Agriculture (since 2010).
George Lundy, 64, American priest and academic, President of Wheeling Jesuit University (2000–2003), stroke.
Yoshimitsu Morita, 61, Japanese film director (The Family Game), liver failure.
Tushar Ranganath, 37, Indian film director (Gulama), heart attack.
Barry Reckord, 85, Jamaican playwright.
Leopold Unger, 89, Polish journalist. 
Kenchappa Varadaraj, 89, Indian Olympic footballer (1948).
Václav Zítek, 79, Czech opera singer.

21

Ann-Mari Adamsson, 77, Swedish actor.
Patrick Bashford, 82, Polish-born British professor of classical guitar.
Bud Bloomfield, 75, American baseball player.
Francis Braganza, 89, Indian Roman Catholic prelate, Bishop of Baroda (1987–1997).
John Chamberlain, 84, American sculptor.
P. K. Iyengar, 80, Indian nuclear scientist.
Alastair Maitland, 95, British diplomat.
Werner Otto, 102, German entrepreneur (Otto GmbH).
Olavi Rokka, 86, Finnish Olympic modern pentathlete, bronze medalist (1952).
Yevhen Rudakov, 69, Russian Olympic bronze medal-winning (1972) football goalkeeper.
Robert Simons, 89, English cricketer (Hertfordshire).
Jonathan Stephenson, 61, English-born Northern Irish politician.
Roberto Szidon, 70, Brazilian classical pianist, heart attack.
Umanosuke Ueda, 71, Japanese professional wrestler and actor, respiratory failure.
Jean-Pierre Urkia, 93, French-born Laotian Roman Catholic prelate, Vicar Apostolic of Paksé (1967–1975).
Yuval Zamir, 48, Israeli actor, voice actor, director and singer, diabetes.

22
Per Berlin, 90, Swedish Olympic silver (1952) and bronze (1956) medal-winning wrestler.
Richard Bessière, 88, French author.
Emanuel Bosák, 87, Czech sports official.
Bettye Danoff, 88, American golfer, founding member of the LPGA.
William Duell, 88, American singer and actor (1776, One Flew Over The Cuckoo's Nest, Police Squad!).
Bennie Ellender, 86, American college football coach (Arkansas State, Tulane), Alzheimer's disease.
Michael von Grünau, 67, Canadian psychologist and neurophysiologist.
Vasant Ranjane, 74, Indian cricketer.
Rogelio Sánchez González, 90, Mexican Roman Catholic prelate, Bishop of Colima (1972–1980).
*Marion Segal Freed, 77, American film producer, editor and screenwriter.
Zithulele Sinqe, 48, South African Olympic long-distance runner, car accident.
Ernest A. Watkinson, 99, Canadian politician.

23
Merrill Kenneth Albert, 88, American author and trial lawyer, heart disease.
Denise Darcel, 87, French actress, aneurysm.
Neil Davids, 56, English footballer.
Cees van Dongen, 79, Dutch motorcycle road racer.
Evelyn Handler, 78, American academic, President of the University of New Hampshire (1980–1983) and Brandeis University (1983–1991), traffic collision.
Bill Klatt, 64, American ice hockey player (Minnesota Fighting Saints), leukemia.
Francis Nigel Lee, 77, British-born American theologian, motor neurone disease.
Tripuraneni Maharadhi, 82, Indian screenwriter.
Aydın Menderes, 65, Turkish politician, son of Adnan Menderes.
Norayr Musheghyan, 76, Armenian wrestler, coach and public activist, world champion (1958).
Abdur Razzaq, 69, Bangladeshi politician.
Bruce Ruxton, 85, Australian veterans' representative and advocate, President of the Victorian RSL (1979–2002).
Muhammad Afzal Zullah, 83, Pakistani jurist, Chief Justice (1990–1993).

24
Monte Amundsen, 81, American opera and musical singer.
M. Salah Baouendi, 74, Tunisian-born American mathematician.
Armando Brambilla, 69, Italian Roman Catholic prelate, Auxiliary Bishop of Rome (since 1994).
Sergio Buso, 61, Italian footballer and coach.
Peggy R. Cook, 73, American politician.
*José Andrés Corral Arredondo, 65, Mexican Roman Catholic prelate, Bishop of Parral (since 1992), heart attack.
Bernard Gert, 77, American philosopher.
Johannes Heesters, 108, Dutch actor and singer, stroke.
István Jutasi, 82, Hungarian Olympic sailor Olympedia – István Jutasi
Marvin Knopp, 78, American mathematician.
Zsuzsi Mary, 64, Hungarian pop singer, suicide.
Jody Rainwater, 92, American bluegrass musician and radio personality, heart disease.
John N. Ross, 91, Irish politician.
Lynn Samuels, 69, American radio personality (Sirius XM).
Walter Söhne, 98, German agronomist. 
Henri Sitek, 82, Polish-French cyclist.
Vitaly Tseshkovsky, 67, Russian chess Grandmaster.

25
Alhaj Mutalib Baig, Afghan politician, suicide bombing.
Israel Baker, 92, American violinist and concertmaster, stroke.
Giorgio Bocca, 91, Italian essayist and journalist.
Ben Breedlove, 18, American Internet personality, cardiac arrest.
Sue Carroll, 58, British journalist, pancreatic cancer.
Adrienne Cooper, 65, American klezmer and Yiddish vocalist, adrenal cancer.
Satyadev Dubey, 75, Indian actor, playwright and director.
Thomas Finnegan, 86, Irish Roman Catholic prelate, Bishop of Killala (1987–2002).
Seán French, 80, Irish politician, Lord Mayor of Cork (1976) and TD (1967–1982).
Jack Fulbeck, 95, American poet and academic.
Habib Galhia, 70, Tunisian boxer, Olympic bronze medalist (1964).
Andrew Geller, 87, American architect, kidney failure.
 Lex Gigeroff, 49, Canadian writer, actor and producer (Lexx), heart attack.
Khalil Ibrahim, 53–54, Sudanese Darfuri rebel leader, air strike.
Sir Roger Jowell, 69, British social statistician.
John Christoffel Kannemeyer, 72, South African writer, authority on Afrikaans literature.
Christophe Laigneau, 46, French footballer (Stade Lavallois).
Alexander Melnikov, 81, Soviet and Russian politician.
Sir Moses Pitakaka, 66, Solomon Islander politician, Governor-General (1994–1999).
George Robb, 85, English footballer (Tottenham Hotspur F.C.), dementia.
Ferenc Schmidt, 70, Hungarian politician.
Jim Sherwood, 69, American musician (The Mothers of Invention).
Simms Taback, 79, American author, graphic artist and illustrator.

26
Kennan Adeang, 69, Nauruan politician, President (1986).
Houston Antwine, 72, American football player (Boston/New England Patriots, Philadelphia Eagles), AFL All-Star (1963–1968), heart failure.
Pedro Armendáriz, Jr., 71, Mexican actor (Zorro series), cancer.
Sarekoppa Bangarappa, 79, Indian politician, Chief Minister of Karnataka (1990–1992).
Joe Bodolai, 63, American comedy writer (Saturday Night Live) and producer, suicide by poisoning.
Sean Collins, 59, American surfer and surf forecaster (Surfline), heart attack.
Fred Fono, 49, Solomon Islander politician, Deputy Prime Minister (2006) and MP for Central Kwara'ae (1997–2010).
John Mackintosh Howie, 75, Scottish mathematician.
Kiyonori Kikutake, Japanese architect. 
Barbara Lea, 82, American jazz singer and actress, Alzheimer's disease.
Lloyd Madden, 93, American football player. 
Wilhelm Noller, 92, German Luftwaffe member, recipient of the Knight's Cross of the Iron Cross.
Sam Rivers, 88, American jazz musician and composer, pneumonia.
James Rizzi, 61, American pop artist.
Constantine Sidamon-Eristoff, 81, American-born Georgian aristocrat, New York City highway commissioner, esophageal cancer.

27
Frank Bourke, 89, Australian football player.
 Catê, 38, Brazilian footballer, car accident.
 Sir Clifford Darling, 89, Bahamian politician, Governor-General (1992–1995).
 Sir Michael Dummett, 86, British philosopher.
 Helen Frankenthaler, 83, American artist.
Julia Sampson Hayward, 77, American tennis player, won Australian Open doubles and mixed doubles (1963).
 Rusty Hevelin, 89, American science fiction fanzine publisher.
 Mykola Koltsov, 75, Russian-born Ukrainian footballer and youth trainer.
 Ante Čedo Martinić, 51, Croatian actor (Ruža vjetrova), stomach cancer.
 Meral Menderes, 78, Turkish opera singer.
 Thinley Norbu, 81, Tibetan Buddhist writer and teacher.
 Sir Iwan Raikes, 90, British vice admiral and naval secretary.
 Betty Jane Rhodes, 90, American actress (The Arizona Raiders, Sweater Girl).
 Martino Scarafile, 84, Italian Roman Catholic prelate, Bishop of Castellaneta (1985–2003).
 Thomas Michael Shanahan, 77, American senior judge of the District Court for the District of Nebraska.
 Dan Terry, 87, American jazz trumpeter and big band leader.
Anne Tyng, 91, American architect.
 Dennis Utter, 72, American politician, Nebraska State Senator (since 2009).
 Johnny Wilson, 82, Canadian ice hockey player and coach (Detroit Red Wings).

28
James Earl Baumgartner, 68, American mathematician.
Bruce Fine, 74, American sports team part-owner.
 Larry Hamilton, 60, American blues singer and songwriter.
Charlotte Kerr, 84, German film director and producer.
Razia Khan, 75, Bangladeshi writer and educationist.
 Don Mueller, 84, American baseball player (New York Giants, Chicago White Sox), MLB All-Star (1954, 1955).
 Hasan Mutlucan, 85, Turkish folk singer.
 Lucia Rikaki, 50, Greek stage, film and television director, cancer.
 Jon Roberts, 63, American drug trafficker, cancer.
 Myron Roderick, 77, American Olympic wrestler (1956) and coach.
 Kaye Stevens, 79, American singer and actress, breast cancer and blood clots.
 Teruo Sugihara, 74, Japanese golfer, prostate cancer.

29
Ivan Andonov, 77, Bulgarian film director and actor.
Paul Antaki, 84, Egyptian Melkite Catholic hierarch, Auxiliary Archbishop of Antioch (1968–2001).
Rosman García, 32, Venezuelan baseball player (Texas Rangers), traffic collision.
Leopold Hawelka, 100, Austrian coffee house owner (Café Hawelka).
John Robert Holmes, 84, Canadian politician, MP for Lambton—Kent (1972–1980).
Ron Howells, 84, Welsh footballer.
Ken Johnson, 80, English footballer.
*Aamir Hayat Khan Rokhri, 55, Pakistani politician, heart attack.
Svein Krøvel, 65, Norwegian cinematographer.
Tyron Perez, 26, Filipino actor (StarStruck), shot.
Amichand Rajbansi, 69, South African politician, Minister without portfolio (1984–1988), Leader of the Minority Front (since 1994).
Bob Wasserman, 77, American police chief and politician, Mayor of Fremont, California (2004–2011), respiratory complications.
Milton Wong, 72, Canadian businessman and philanthropist, pancreatic cancer.

30
 Ted Beard, 90, American baseball player (Pittsburgh Pirates, Chicago White Sox).
Garnet Campbell, 84, Canadian curler.
Mike Colalillo, 86, American soldier, Medal of Honor recipient.
Dezső Garas, 77, Hungarian actor.
Mona Guérin, 77, Haitian writer and playwright.
*Muhammad Hamidullah Khan, 74, Bangladeshi politician.
Sir Robert Horton, 72, British businessman.
*Kim Geun-tae, 64, South Korean politician, Minister of Health and Welfare (2004–2006), pneumonia and kidney failure.
Richard Lainhart, 58, American artist and composer, complications after surgery.
Ricardo Legorreta, 80, Mexican architect, UIA Gold Medal recipient, cancer.
Ronald Searle, 91, British cartoonist (St Trinian's School, Molesworth).
Doug Sellars, 50, Canadian television executive (Fox Sports Media Group, CBC Sports), heart attack.
Vasily Starodubtsev, 80, Russian politician, Governor of Tula Oblast (1997–2005), member of the Gang of Eight (1991).
Eleanor Ross Taylor, 91, American poet.
Mirko Tremaglia, 85, Italian politician, Minister without portfolio (2001–2006).
Eva Zeisel, 105, Hungarian-born American ceramic artist and designer.

31
 Kanati Allen, 64, American Olympic gymnast.
 Murray Barnes, 57, Australian soccer player (Sydney Hakoah), national captain (1980–1981).
Celia Dale, 99, British crime writer.
 Alfonso Gómez-Lobo, 71, Chilean-born American academic, professor of metaphysics and moral philosophy (Georgetown University).
Roy Greenwood, 80, English footballer (Crystal Palace F.C.).
 Sir David Hirst, 86, British jurist.
 Rex Jackson, 83, Australian politician and convicted criminal, New South Wales MLA for Bulli (1955–1971) and Heathcote (1971–1986).
 Penny Jordan, 65, British romantic novelist.
 Jerzy Kluger, 90, Polish businessman, bronchitis.
 Stanley Kwan, 86, Hong Kong banker, creator of the Hang Seng Index, heart failure.
 Glenn Lord, 80, American editor.
 Michael Mann, 87, British Anglican prelate, Dean of Windsor (1976–1989).

References 

2011-12
 12